Tverregga Spur is a spur 3 nautical miles (6 km) west of Mount Hallgren, in the Kirwan Escarpment of Queen Maud Land. Mapped by Norwegian cartographers from surveys and air photos by Norwegian-British-Swedish Antarctic Expedition (NBSAE) (1949–52) and additional air photos (1958–59), and named Tverregga (the transverse ridge).

See also
Tverreggtelen Hill

Ridges of Queen Maud Land
Princess Martha Coast